The 1994–95 Moldovan "A" Division season was the 4th since its establishment. A total of 19 teams contested the league.

League table

References

Moldovan Liga 1 seasons
2
Moldova